Will Slade (born 24 October 1983) is a former Australian rules footballer who played for the Geelong Football Club in the Australian Football League (AFL).

Early career
In round 19, 2002, Slade debuted for the Geelong Football Club. He played four senior games in his first year. Slade managed only 11 games between 2002 and 2005 due to chronic osteitis pubis. 

Slade was delisted and redrafted in after the 2005 season. He played the first seven games of the 2006 season and had a big impact in the 2006 pre-season final.

Slade was delisted again at the end of the 2006 season, and despite training with Hawthorn prior to the pre-season draft, was not selected.

References

External links

1983 births
Geelong Football Club players
Living people
People educated at Scotch College, Melbourne
Oakleigh Chargers players
Australian rules footballers from Victoria (Australia)